Tom Jackson (3 July 1881 – 5 January 1929) was an Australian rules footballer who played with Melbourne in the Victorian Football League (VFL).

Notes

External links 
		
 
Tom Jackson on Demonwiki

1881 births
1929 deaths
Australian rules footballers from Victoria (Australia)
Melbourne Football Club players